Ladycross is a hamlet near Werrington (where the population of the 2011 census was included.) in Cornwall, England. It is on the B3254 road half a mile north of Yeolmbridge.

References

Hamlets in Cornwall